Arachne (minor planet designation: 407 Arachne) is a large Main belt asteroid. It is classified as a C-type asteroid and is probably composed of carbonaceous material. It was discovered on 13 October 1895, by German astronomer Max Wolf at Heidelberg Observatory.

References

External links
 
 

Background asteroids
Arachne
Arachne
C-type asteroids (Tholen)
18951013